Daniel Jesse Boateng (born 2 September 1992) is a footballer who plays as a defender. Boateng has previously played for Arsenal, Swindon Town, Oxford United, Hibernian, Södertälje FK, Airdrieonians, Raków Częstochowa and Olimpia Grudziądz. He was born in England and is of Ghanaian descent.

Club career

Arsenal
Boateng joined the youth academy of Arsenal in September 2003 and progressed through the ranks. On 20 July 2009, he made his reserves debut in a friendly against Lincoln City. He signed a professional contract with Arsenal in July 2010. He made his competitive first team debut for Arsenal in the League Cup against Bolton Wanderers on 25 October 2011.

During the 2011–12 season, Boateng was named as captain occasionally for Arsenal's reserve side. At the end of the 2013–14 season, Boateng was released by Arsenal upon expiry of his contract.

Loan spells
During summer 2011, Boateng was expected to join Swindon Town, but the move broke down. On 21 January 2012, he then did make the move, signing on loan until the end of the 2011–12 season. Boateng said he joined Swindon to play under manager Paolo Di Canio. A month after signing, Boateng made his debut for the club, as Swindon won 2–1 against Hereford United on 21 February 2014. After making two appearances for Swindon, he returned to Arsenal.

At the commencement of the 2012–13 season, Boateng joined Oxford United on a six-month loan deal on 28 August 2012. After being on the bench for the first two games, Boateng made his debut for the club, in a 4–0 loss against Burton Albion on 15 September 2012. After only making two appearances for the club, manager Chris Wilder suggested Boateng needed to improve and hinted that he could end his loan spell early to free up funds. In the winter transfer window, Boateng returned to Arsenal.

On 31 January 2014, Boateng joined Scottish Premiership club Hibernian on loan. Boateng stated the physicality in Scottish Football was nothing he can't handle. He made his Hibs debut, coming on as a substitute for Danny Handling in the 87th minute in a 2–1 win over Ross County on 15 February 2014. He would make just four appearances for the club and left at the end of the season following their relegation to the Scottish Championship.

Södertälje
On 13 August 2015, Boateng joined Swedish Football Division 1 side Södertälje FK on a contract until the end of the season. On 22 August, he made his league debut, playing the whole match as his side won 3–1 against Motala AIF.

Airdrieonians
Boateng was announced as an Airdrieonians player on a one-year contract on 4 August 2016, after leaving Södertälje FK. Boateng made 24 appearances for the club before being released in May 2017.

Aerostar Bacău
On 20 February 2019, he signed a 6-month contract with Romanian Liga II club CS Aerostar Bacău.

Honours
 Arsenal
 Premier Academy League: 2009–10

Club statistics

References

External links

Daniel Boateng: Arsenal Profile

1992 births
Living people
People from Enfield, London
English sportspeople of Ghanaian descent
English footballers
Association football defenders
English Football League players
Scottish Professional Football League players
I liga players
Liga II players
Arsenal F.C. players
Swindon Town F.C. players
Oxford United F.C. players
Hibernian F.C. players
Södertälje FK players
Airdrieonians F.C. players
Raków Częstochowa players
Olimpia Grudziądz players
CS Aerostar Bacău players
Welling United F.C. players
English expatriate footballers
Expatriate footballers in Scotland
English expatriate sportspeople in Sweden
Expatriate footballers in Sweden
English expatriate sportspeople in Poland
Expatriate footballers in Poland
English expatriate sportspeople in Romania
Expatriate footballers in Romania